

N 
Nagashima Spa Land (Mie Prefecture, Japan)
Nara Dreamland (Nara, Japan)
Nasu Highland (Nasu, Japan)
Niagara Amusement Park & Splash World (Grand Island, New York, United States)
Nickelodeon Universe (Bloomington, Minnesota and East Rutherford, New Jersey, United States)
Noah's Ark Waterpark (Wisconsin Dells, Wisconsin, United States)

O 
 Oaks Amusement Park (Portland, Oregon, United States)
 Oakwood Theme Park (Narberth, Pembrokeshire, Wales)
 Ocean Park Hong Kong (Hong Kong, China)
 Oceans of Fun (Kansas City, Missouri, United States)
 Old Town (Orlando, Florida, United States)
 Ontario Place (Toronto, Canada)
 Opryland USA (Nashville, Tennessee, United States)

P 
Pacific Park (Santa Monica, California, United States)
Paragon Park (Hull, Massachusetts, United States)
Parc Astérix (near Paris, France)
Parque de Atracciones de Madrid (Madrid, Spain)
Phantasialand (Brühl, North Rhine-Westphalia, Germany)
Palace Playland (Old Orchard Beach, Maine, United States)
Playcenter (São Paulo, Brazil)
Playland (Rye, New York, United States)
Playland (Vancouver, Canada)
Pleasure Beach Blackpool (Lancashire, England)
Pleasure Island Family Theme Park (Cleethorpes, United Kingdom)
Pleasureland Southport (Southport, England)
Plopsa Coo (Coo, Stavelot, Belgium)
Plopsa Indoor Hasselt Hasselt, Belgium)
Plopsaland (Adinkerke, Belgium)
PortAventura Caribe Aquatic Park (Salou, Catalonia, Spain)
PortAventura Park (Salou, Catalonia, Spain)
PowerPark (Alahärmä, Finland)

Q 
Quassy Amusement Park (Middlebury, Connecticut, United States)

R 
Raging Waters (Sacramento, California, United States)
Raging Waters (San Dimas, California, United States)
Raging Waters (San Jose, California, United States)
Rainbow's End (Auckland, New Zealand)
Ratanga Junction (Cape Town, South Africa)
Republica de los Niños (La Plata, Buenos Aires, Argentina)
Riverside Amusement Park (Indianapolis, United States) 
Rusutsu Resort (Rusutsu, Hokkaidō, Japan)

S 
San Diego Zoo (San Diego, California, United States)
San Diego Zoo Safari Park (Escondido, California, United States)
Sandy Lake Amusement Park (Carrollton, Texas, United States)
Sanrio Harmonyland (Hiji, Ōita, Kyūshū)
Sanrio Puroland (Tama New Town, Tokyo, Japan)
Santa Park (Rovaniemi, Finland)
Santa's Land (Cherokee, North Carolina, United States)
Santa's Village (Bracebridge, Ontario, Canada)
Santa's Village (Jefferson, New Hampshire, United States)
Santa's Workshop (Wilmington, New York, United States)
Särkänniemi (Tampere, Finland)
Schlitterbahn (New Braunfels, Texas, South Padre Island, Texas, Galveston, Texas and Kansas City, Kansas, United States)
Sea World (Gold Coast, Queensland, Australia)
Seabreeze Amusement Park (Irondequoit, New York, United States)
SeaWorld Abu Dhabi (Abu Dhabi, United Arab Emirates)
SeaWorld Orlando (Orlando, Florida, United States)
SeaWorld San Antonio (San Antonio, Texas, United States)
SeaWorld San Diego (San Diego, California, United States)
Seoul Land (Gwacheon, Gyeonggi, Seoul, South Korea)
Sesame Place (Langhorne, Pennsylvania, United States)
Sesame Place (Chula Vista, California, United States)
Shanghai Disneyland Park (Pudong, Shanghai, China)
Silver Dollar City (Branson, Missouri, United States)
Silverwood Theme Park (Athol, Idaho, United States)
Six Flags America (Largo, Maryland, United States)
Six Flags AstroWorld (Houston, Texas, United States)
Six Flags Atlantis (Hollywood, Florida, United States)
Six Flags Autoworld (Flint, Michigan, United States)
Six Flags Darien Lake (Darien, New York, United States)
Six Flags Discovery Kingdom (Vallejo, California, United States)
Six Flags Fiesta Texas (San Antonio, Texas, United States)
Six Flags Great Adventure (Jackson, New Jersey, United States)
Six Flags Great America (Gurnee, Illinois, United States)
Six Flags Hurricane Harbor (Jackson, New Jersey, Valencia, California, Arlington, Texas, and Springfield, Massachusetts, United States)
Six Flags Hurricane Harbor Chicago (Gurnee, Illinois, United States)
Six Flags Hurricane Harbor Concord (Concord, California, United States)
Six Flags Hurricane Harbor Darien Lake (Darien, New York, United States)
Six Flags Hurricane Harbor Oklahoma City (Oklahoma City, Oklahoma, United States)
Six Flags Hurricane Harbor Phoenix (Phoenix, Arizona, United States)
Six Flags Hurricane Harbor Rockford (Rockford, Illinois, United States)
Six Flags Hurricane Harbor SplashTown (Spring, Texas, United States)
Six Flags Magic Mountain (Valencia, California, United States)
Six Flags México (Tlalpan, Mexico City, Mexico)
Six Flags New England (Agawam, Massachusetts, United States)
Six Flags New Orleans (New Orleans, Louisiana, United States)
Six Flags Over Georgia (Austell, Georgia, United States)
Six Flags Over Texas (Arlington, Texas, United States)
Six Flags St. Louis (Eureka, Missouri, United States)
Six Flags White Water (Marietta, Georgia, United States)
Six Flags Wild Safari (Jackson, New Jersey, United States)
Six Gun City (Jefferson, New Hampshire, United States)
Slagharen (Slagharen, Netherlands)
Soak City (Shakopee, Minnesota, United States)
Soak City (Mason, Ohio, United States)
Soak City (Doswell, Virginia, United States)
Splendid China (Citrus Ridge, Florida, United States; defunct)
Splash Works (Vaughan, Ontario, Canada) 
Steel Pier (Atlantic City, New Jersey, United States)
The Strat (Las Vegas, Nevada, United States)
Story Land (Bartlett, New Hampshire, United States)
Storyland (Renfrew, Ontario, Canada)
Sunway Lagoon (Kuala Lumpur, Malaysia)
Suoi Tien Amusement Park (Ho Chi Minh City, Vietnam)

N

nl:Lijst van attractieparken (N-S)
sv:Lista över nöjesparker (M-Q)